Richard of Normandy may refer to:
 Richard I of Normandy, "the Fearless", count (942–996)
 Richard II of Normandy, "the Good", duke (996–1026)
 Richard, son of William the Conqueror, called "Duke of Bernay" (–)